Not Wanted is a 1949 American drama film directed by Elmer Clifton and an un-credited Ida Lupino and starring Sally Forrest, Keefe Brasselle and Leo Penn.

A few days after shooting started, Clifton suffered a heart attack. Lupino stepped in to direct the film (which she co-wrote and co-produced) without taking credit (this was the last film that Clifton worked on but not his final overall effort, as two films of his would be released after his death on October 15, 1949). The film's sets were designed by the art director Charles D. Hall. Shooting took place at the Universal Studios.

Synopsis
A young woman is attracted to a travelling musician while feeling stifled at how her parents treat her. She abandons her home town to follow him but he has decided to move on to chase his dream career. After he has left, she finds out that she is pregnant and faces a decision over what to do about her impending baby. She gives the child away after giving birth but finds herself feeling guilty to the point where she nearly snatches a child from a stroller. In the meantime, her employer at the gas station has fallen in love with her.

Cast
 Sally Forrest as Sally Kelton 
 Keefe Brasselle as Drew Baxter 
 Leo Penn as Steve Ryan 
 Dorothy Adams as Mrs. Aggie Kelton 
 Wheaton Chambers as Mr. Kelton 
 Rita Lupino as Joan 
 Audrey Farr as Nancy 
 Carole Donne as Jane 
 Ruth Clifford as Mrs. Elizabeth Stone 
 Ruthelma Stevens as Miss James 
 Virginia Mullen as Mrs. Banning, Infant's mother 
 Marie Harmon as Irene 
 Roger Anderson as Bill Aikens 
 Gregg Barton as Patrolman 
 Charles Seel as Dr. Williams 
 Lawrence Dobkin as Assistant District Attorney 
 Patrick Whyte as Reverend Culbertson

Critical reception
The film has been received positively by modern critics. It holds a 80% approval rating on Rotten Tomatoes, based on 5 reviews.

Richard Brody of The New Yorker in a glowing review lauded the film and Lupino's direction, writing,  Lupino displays a documentary avidity for the details of work and play. She conveys Sally’s unworldly, impractical passion with tender, intimate closeups and an intense, effects-driven subjectivity—a hallucinatory sequence in a hospital is a masterpiece of low-budget Expressionism. An incongruous yet majestic chase scene, highlighting a photogenic array of Los Angeles locations, projects the intimate melodrama onto the world stage.

References

Bibliography
 Daniel Bubbeo. The Women of Warner Brothers: The Lives and Careers of 15 Leading Ladies, with Filmographies for Each. McFarland, 2001.

External links
 

1949 films
1949 drama films
1940s English-language films
American drama films
Films directed by Ida Lupino
Films directed by Elmer Clifton
Film Classics films
American black-and-white films
1940s American films
English-language drama films